Radio Bugojno is a Bosnian local public radio station, broadcasting from Bugojno, Bosnia and Herzegovina.

Radio Bugojno was launched on 13 October 1969 by the municipal council of Bugojno. As local/municipal radio station in SR Bosnia and Herzegovina, it was part of Radio Sarajevo network affiliate.

Program is mainly produced in Bosnian language. This radio station broadcasts a variety of programs such as music, local news and talk shows. Estimated number of potential listeners is around 51,129.

TV Bugojno is also part of public municipality services.

Frequencies
 Bugojno

See also 
List of radio stations in Bosnia and Herzegovina

References

External links 
 www.rtvbugojno.ba
 Communications Regulatory Agency of Bosnia and Herzegovina

Bugojno
Central Bosnia Canton
Radio stations established in 1969